Montgomery is an unincorporated community in Trigg County, Kentucky, United States.

References

Unincorporated communities in Trigg County, Kentucky
Unincorporated communities in Kentucky